Team Mexico is a professional independent baseball team representing Mexico.  They play in the developmental Arizona Winter League, a short-season instructional winter league affiliated with the North American League and play in the International Division along with the Saskatchewan Silver Sox, Sonora Pilots, Team Canada and Western Canada Miners as of 2011.  The team is owned by Diamond Sports & Entertainment and will play their home and away games at Desert Sun Stadium in Yuma.

They replaced the defending AWL champion Calgary Vipers, who would not return for 2011.

Year-By-Year Records

Arizona Winter League:

References

External links
 Arizona Winter League's official website
 Golden Baseball League

Arizona Winter League teams
Professional baseball teams in Arizona